Xıçaso (also, Xiçaso, Khachasu, and Khychaso) is a village in the Astara Rayon of Azerbaijan.  The village forms part of the municipality of Şəmətük.

References 

Populated places in Astara District